Tjintu Desert Band is a Central Australian Indigenous band from Ikuntji, a small community 230 kilometres west of Alice Springs. Previously known as Sunshine Reggae or Sunshine Reggae Band they changed their name to include the Luritja word for "sunshine". They sing in a mixture of Luritja and English.

Discography
Sunshine Reggae
Watjilarrinya Homesick - CAAMA

Tjintu Desert Band
Tjamuku Ngurra (2014) - CAAMA

References

Indigenous Australian musical groups
Northern Territory musical groups